Giacomo Badoer may refer to:

Giacomo Badoer (fl. 1403–1442), Venetian merchant
Giacomo Badoer (c. 1457 – 1537), Venetian administrator
Giacomo Badoer (c. 1575 – c. 1620), French diplomat
Giacomo Badoaro (1602–1654), Venetian poet